The 4th Lithuanian Vanguard Regiment was a military unit of the Grand Duchy of Lithuania. The full name was 4th Lithuanian Advance Guard Regiment of Josef Bielak.

History

Origins 
Formed in 1733 by gathering all cavalry banners of the Voivode of Kiev Potocki family, mostly composed of Tatars. Aleksander Ułan commanded the regiment in 1734.

Electorate of Saxony 
This regiment was leased to the Royal Saxon Army during the Wettin dynasty's reign and continuously fought in the War of Polish Succession (1734-1738), War of the Austrian Succession (1740-1748) and the Seven Years War (1756-1763).

Grand Duchy of Lithuania 
In 1764, it was summoned by the Sejm of 1764 to return to Lithuania.

Bar Confederation 
The regiment fought against the Wettin dynasty's supporters.

1772-1792 
The regiment was stationed in Kamieniec Litewski (1782-87) and Barysaw (1790 onwards).

War in Defence of the Constitution

Kościuszko Uprising 
Under Józef Bielak's command, the regiment took part in the battles of Izabelin, Mscibow, Brzesc, Dereczyn, Maciejowice, Praga.

Uniforms 
In 1776-89, all the officers and soldiers in the regiment had white cockades, with the officers also having white plumes. The towarzycz had red belts and plumes, meanwhile, the rankers had only white belts.

Commanders 
Pułkowniks: 

 Sichodziński (1733-1756), 
 Czymbaj Murza Rudnicki (1756-1764), 
 gen. mjr. Józef Bielak (17 April 1764 - 1794 [death])
  (1794).

External links 

 The 4th Lithuanian Vanguard Regiment is linked to Graf Rudnicki Uhlans

References

 

Cavalry regiments of Lithuania
Military units and formations established in 1733